Tetramermis is a genus of nematodes belonging to the family Mermithidae.

Species:
 Tetramermis lacustris Rubzov, 1978 
 Tetramermis tenuis (Leidy, 1878) 
 Tetramermis ventrosoma Rubzov, 1978

References

Mermithidae
Enoplea genera